This list consists of fictional prisons from various works of literature, film and television:

! scope=col|Prison
! scope=col| Location
! scope=col| Appeared in
|-
| Abbot State Penitentiary || Carnate Island, Maryland || The Suffering (2004)
|-
| Arkham Asylum || Gotham City || Batman, first app. Batman #258 (1974)
|-
| Ashecliffe Hospital || Boston Harbor Islands ||
 Shutter Island (novel) (2003)
 Shutter Island (film) (film) (2010)
|-
| Azkaban Prison || North Sea, Britain ||
 Harry Potter and the Chamber of Secrets (1998)
 Harry Potter and the Prisoner of Azkaban (1999)
 Harry Potter and the Order of the Phoenix (2003)
|-
| Balduq Prison || Gllia || Ys IX: Monstrum Nox
|-
| Bargate Prison || Albion || Fable (2004)
|-
| Belle Reve || Louisiana ||
 Suicide Squad (1987)
 Smallville (2001)
 Young Justice (2011)
 Suicide Squad (2016)
|-
| HMP Blakedown || Devon, England || Convict 99 (1938)
|-
| Blackgate Penitentiary || near Gotham City || Batman
|-
| Boomsby || Bangalla || The Phantom, first app. "The Slave Market of Mucar" (1961)
|-
| Boltovo Dam || Mariel System || Star Wars expanded universe, Novel: "Liberty Edge." (2016)
|-
| HMP Brackerley || Yorkshire, England  || Brackerley Prison Mysteries (2021-)
|-
| HMP Broadmarsh || London, England  || Dead Boss (2012)
|-
| Butcher Bay || Unspecified planet || The Chronicles of Riddick: Escape From Butcher Bay (2004)
|-
| Checkpoint 19 || Zubrowka || The Grand Budapest Hotel (2014)
|-
| Citadel Prison || Golden City || Catalyst: Agents of Change (1994)
|-
| Cochlea Ghoul Detention Center || Tokyo, 23rd ward || Tokyo Ghoul (2011)
|-
| Coldridge Prison || Dunwall || Dishonored (2012)
|-
| Cold Mountain Penitentiary || Louisiana (film) ||
 The Green Mile (novel) (1996)
 The Green Mile (film) (1999)
|-
| Crematoria Triple-Max Prison || Planet Crematoria || The Chronicles of Riddick (2004)
|-
| HMP Crown Hill || Midsomer (fictional county in England) ||
 Midsomer Murders (1997)
 Death of a Stranger (1999)
|-
| Deep Gut Prison || City of London || Mortal Engines (film)
|-
| HMP Dickens Hill || London || EastEnders
|-
| Durgesh Prison || Kyrat, The Himalayas || Far Cry 4 (2014)
|-
| Dol Guldur || Mirkwood, Middle-earth || The Lord of the Rings (1954)
|-
| East Lee S. Capable Maximum Security Prison || New York City || Justice Squad
|-
| Elliott Bay Penitentiary || Seattle, Washington || The Killing (U.S. TV series) (2013)
|-
| Erewhon Prison || Unknown || Face/Off (1997)
|-
| HMP Farnleigh || Oxford, England || Inspector Morse (TV series) (1978–2000), Endeavour (TV series) (2013–Present)
|-
| Fiorina "Fury" 161 || Extraterrestrial planet || Alien 3 (1992)
|-
| Fox River State Penitentiary || Joliet, Illinois ||
 Prison Break (2005)
 Breakout Kings (2011)
|-
| Goodwood Women's Prison || Melbourne, Victoria, Australia || Neighbours (1985)
|-
| Gouffre Martel || France || The Stars My Destination (1956)
|-
| Green Dolphin Street Maximum Security Prison || Port St. Lucie, Florida || Jojo's Bizarre Adventure Stone Ocean (2000)
|-
| The Gulag || Kansas || Kingdom Come (comics) (1996)
|-
| Hang-em-all Prison || Unknown || The Three Stooges: In the Sweet Pie and Pie (1941)
|-
| Helena || Endiness || Legend of Dragoon (1999)
|-
| Hellglaz Concentration and Extermination Camp || The Devilfire Empire || A Devilfire Nightmare (TBA)
|-
| Highgate Prison || New Mexico, United States || The Earth is My Prison (2020)
|- 
| Illsveil || Filgaia || Wild Arms 2 (1999)
|-
| Impel Down || Calm Belt || One Piece (1997–present)
|-
| Iron Heights || Keystone City || Flash: Iron Heights (2001)
|-
| Litchfield Correctional Facility || Litchfield, New York || Orange Is the New Black (2013)
|-
| HMP Larkhall || London, England || Bad Girls (1999–2006)
|-
| LunarMax Prison || The Moon || Men in Black 3 (2012)
|-
| Miami-Dade State Penitentiary || Miami || Prison Break: The Final Break (2009)
|-
| Montgomery Burns State Prison || Springfield || The Simpsons episode "The Seven-Beer Snitch" (2005)
|-
| MS One || Artificial Earth satellite || Lockout (film) (2012)
|-
| Nova Prospekt || Eastern Europe || Half-Life 2 (2004)
|-x
|-
| Ogygia Prison || Sana'a, Yemen || Prison Break (2005)
|-
| Oswald State Correctional Facility || Upstate New York || Oz (1997)
|-
| Overlook Penitentiary || Silent Hill, Maine ||
 Silent Hill: Homecoming (2012)
 Silent Hill: Downpour (2009)
|-
| Pavelock Prison || South Quarter, The City || Thief: Deadly Shadows (2004)
|-
| Penitenciaría Federal de Sona || Soná District, Veraguas, Republic of Panama || Prison Break (2005)
|-
| The Phantom Zone || fictional dimension || Superman and other DC Comics stories
|-
| The Raft || New York ||
 The New Avengers #1
 Alias #26
|-
| Ravencroft Institute for the Criminally Insane|| New York || Web of Spider-Man #112 (1994)
|-
| HMP Redford || Weatherfield, England || Coronation Street (2007)
|-
| Rura Penthe || Fictional island || 20,000 Leagues Under the Sea (film) (1954)
|-
| Rura Penthe Penal Colony Asteroid || Beta Penthe system, Klingon Empire ||
 Star Trek VI: The Undiscovered Country (1991)
 Judgment (Star Trek: Enterprise) (2003)
|-
| Ryall State Prison || Maine || Silent Hill: Downpour (2012)
|-
| Seravno Prison || Svardia? || Mission: Impossible episode "Old Man Out" (1966)
|-
| Sharkmoor Prison || Unknown in some sea destroyed || Mortal Engines (film)
|-
| Shawshank Prison || Maine ||
 Rita Hayworth and Shawshank Redemption (1982)
 The Shawshank Redemption (1994)
|-
| Shayol || Shayol (planet) || A Planet Named Shayol (1961)
|-
| HMP Slade || Cumbria, England || Porridge (1974–1977), Birds of a Feather - TV Series (1995)
|-
| Slabside Maximum Security Prison || Star City, United States || Arrow (2017–2019)
|-
| The SOM || In an orbit around an unknown exoplanet || Void Bastards (2019)
|-
| Stockton State Penitentiary || Stockton, California || Sons of Anarchy (2008)
|-
| HMP Stone Park || Unknown || Within These Walls (1974)
|-
| Stormcage Containment Facility || Unknown planet || Doctor Who (2010)
|-
| Superjail || Dimension 5612 || Superjail! (2007)
|-
| Takron-Galtos || Takron-Galtos || Adventure Comics #359 (1967)
|-
| The Tanty || Ankh-Morpork || Feet of Clay (1996)
|-
| HMP Teddington || Teddington, England || The Benny Hill Show and The Best of Benny Hill
|-
| Toluca Prison || Silent Hill || Silent Hill 2 (2001)
|-
| The Vannacutt Psychiatric Institute for the Criminally Insane || Los Angeles, California ||
 House on Haunted Hill (1999)
 Return to House on Haunted Hill (2007)
|-
| The Vault || Colorado || Avengers Annual #15 (1986)
|-
| The Village || Hotel Portmeirion, Gwynedd, Wales || The Prisoner (1967)
|-
| Virginia Central Penitentiary || Waverly, Virginia || The Following (2013)
|-
| Wakefield State Prison || Arkansas || Brubaker (1980)
|-
| Warrinor Prison || Melbourne, Victoria, Australia || Neighbours (1985)
|-
| Water Prison || Silent Hill || Silent Hill 4: The Room (2004)
|-
| Wentworth Detention Centre or Wentworth Correctional Centre || Melbourne, Victoria, Australia ||
 Prisoner: Cell Block H (1979–1986)
 Wentworth (2013–present)
|-
| The Wheel of Kharnabar || Sibornal, Helliconia || Helliconia Winter (1985)
|-
| The Ziggurat || Paragon City, Rhode Island || City of Heroes (comics and videogame)
|-

 
Fictional prisons
Prisons